TGU may refer to:

 Tokyo Gakugei University, a national university in Tokyo, Japan
 Toncontín International Airport (IATA code: TGU), an international airport in Tegucigalpa, Honduras
 Transglobal Underground, a London-based music collective
 Тартуский государственный университет (Tartuskiy gosudárstvennyy universitét) - Tartu State University, former name of the University of Tartu